The 2011 Durango massacres were a series of mass murders that occurred in 2011. According to El Universal and Yahoo! News, at least 340 bodies have been found in mass graves around the city of Durango as of February 2012; These mass graves are the first of their kind in the state of Durango and third of their kind in Mexico. These mass graves had more bodies than the 2011 Tamaulipas massacre of 189 bus passengers. Since April 2011, there have been 7 mass graves found around Durango. One of these mass graves was found in a vacant auto repair lot in Durango with 89 bodies. One of the bodies identified was Alfonso Peña, the former mayor of Tepehuanes Municipality, Durango.

See also
List of massacres in Mexico
Nuevo León mass graves
Coahuila mass graves
2010 San Fernando massacre
2011 San Fernando massacre

References

 
2011 murders in Mexico
21st-century mass murder in Mexico
2011 massacres
Durango massacre
Mexico
Massacres in Mexico
Organized crime events in Mexico
Violent non-state actor incidents in Mexico